Direction Island is located in the Cocos (Keeling) Islands group.  It is the northeasternmost of the South Keeling Islands.

A slipway and tank associated with the flying boat and sea rescue presence on the island in the early twentieth century are listed on the Australian Commonwealth Heritage List.

References